Horry County is the easternmost county in the U.S. state of South Carolina. As of the 2020 census, its population was 351,029. It is the fourth-most populous county in South Carolina. The county seat is Conway.

Horry County is the central county in the Myrtle Beach-Conway-North Myrtle Beach, SC-NC Metropolitan Statistical Area. It is in the Pee Dee region of South Carolina, about 90 miles north of Charleston, South Carolina, and about 130 miles east of the state capital, Columbia.

History
Horry County (pronounced OH-ree) was created from Georgetown District in 1801. At this time, the county had an estimated population of 550. Isolated by the many rivers and swamps typical of the South Carolina Lowcountry, the area essentially was surrounded by water, forcing its inhabitants to survive without much assistance from the "outside world". This caused the county residents to become an extremely independent populace, and they named their county "The Independent Republic of Horry". The county was named after, and in honor of, Revolutionary War hero Peter Horry who was born in South Carolina around 1743. Horry started his military career in 1775 as one of 20 captains, elected by the Provincial Congress of South Carolina, to serve the 1st and 2nd Regiments. In 1790, he was assigned to the South Carolina militia under Brigadier General Francis Marion

The population has increased more than fourfold since 1970, as the area has become a destination for retirees and people owning second homes. It has been developed for resorts and retirement communities. The majority-White residents have constituted a majority-Republican voter base since the late 20th century.

On October 29, 2012, the county paid homage to the man for whom the county is named. It commissioned a bronze sculpture of Peter Horry, installing it inside the Horry County Government and Justice Center. The sculpture was designed by artist Garland Weeks. Coastal Monument of Conway designed the stone base. The base of the sculpture is inscribed with the names of the 1801 commissioners on one side and the names of 2011 Horry County Council members on the other; a brief biography of General Peter Horry is on the front. It cost slightly more than $16,200 for both the bust/sculpture and the stone base.

Geography

It is the largest county by land area in South Carolina. The highest point in the county is 124 ft above sea level.
Horry County is in the northeastern corner of South Carolina. It is a diverse land made up of rivers, beaches, forests, and swamps, and is bordered by the Atlantic Ocean to the east, the Little Pee Dee River and Drowning Creek (also known as the Lumber River) on its western side, and North Carolina to the north. The river runs through the coastal plain, along the eastern border between the two states, and into the Atlantic Ocean.

National protected area
 Waccamaw National Wildlife Refuge (part)

State and local protected areas/sites 
 Heritage Shores Nature Preserve
 Horry County Museum
 Lewis Ocean Bay Heritage Preserve
 Myrtle Beach State Park
 North Myrtle Beach Area Historical Museum
 Russell Burgess Coastal Preserve

Major water bodies 
 Atlantic Ocean
  Calabash River
 Great Pee Dee River
 Intracoastal Waterway
  Lake Busbee
 Little Pee Dee River
 Little River
 Long Bay
 Lumber River
 Murrells Inlet
 Tuckahoe Bay
 Waccamaw River

Adjacent counties
 Columbus County, North Carolina - northeast
 Brunswick County, North Carolina - east
 Georgetown County - southwest
 Marion County - west
 Dillon County - northwest

Transportation

Airports
 Myrtle Beach International Airport (MYR)
 Grand Strand Airport - North Myrtle Beach (CRE)
 Conway-Horry County Airport (HYW)
 Twin City Airport - Loris (5J9)
 Green Sea Airport (S79)

Mass transit
 The Coast RTA bus system operates seven days a week, 364 days a year, on 15 routes throughout the Horry County/Grand Strand area, including Myrtle Beach, North Myrtle Beach, Surfside Beach, Garden City, Conway, Loris, and Aynor.

Major highways

  (Concurrency with US 501)
  (Concurrency with US 17 and SC 31)
 
 
 
 
 
 
 
 
 
  (Conway 1)
  (Conway 2)
 
 
 
 
 
 
 
 
 
 
 
 
  (Red Hill 1)
  (Red Hill 2)

Demographics

2020 census

As of the 2020 United States census, 351,029 people, 140,260 households, and 89,281 families were residing in the county.

2010 census
As of the 2010 United States Census, 269,291 people, 112,225 households, and 72,254 families resided in the county. The 185,992 housing units averaged . The racial makeup of the county was 79.9% White, 13.4% Black or African American, 1.0% Asian, 0.5% American Indian, 0.1% Pacific Islander, 3.1% from other races, and 2.0% from two or more races. Those of Hispanic or Latino origin made up 6.2% of the population. In terms of ancestry, 15.3% were American, 13.4% were African American (which can include other ethnicities), 13.3% were Irish, 12.8% were German, 11.3% were English, and 6.1% were Italian.

Of the 112,225 households, 27.3% had children under 18 living with them, 47.2% were married couples living together, 12.5% had a female householder with no husband present, 35.6% were not families, and 26.8% of all households were made up of individuals. The average household size was 2.37, and the average family size was 2.84. The median age was 41.1 years.

The median income for a household in the county was $43,142 and for a family was $51,608. Males had a median income of $37,351 versus $29,525 for females. The per capita income for the county was $24,811. About 11.6% of families and 16.1% of the population were below the poverty line, including 25.2% of those under age 18 and 7.5% of those age 65 or over.

Law, government, and politics

State delegation 
Horry County has a South Carolina House of Representatives delegation made up of 10 state representatives. In addition, the county has a South Carolina Senate delegation made up of five state senators. The delegations work concurrently to represent county issues in Columbia.

State House of Representatives delegation 
The county's State House of Representatives delegation is currently made up of:

State Senate delegation 
The county's State Senate delegation is currently made up of:

County council
The county council of Horry County consists of members who represent 11 single-member districts with a chairman voted at-large. The county council meets at the Horry County Government and Justice Center in the first week of every month. Patricia S. Hartley is the clerk to council, members of the county council include:

Current county council members

Past composition of the county council

Law enforcement
The Horry County Police Department provides 24-hour services to the unincorporated areas of the county. It is the only county police department in South Carolina. The Horry County Sheriff's Office is responsible for courthouse security, processing of warrants, fingerprinting, registration of sex offenders, funeral escorts, background checks, and managing the J. Reuben Long Detention Center. The South Carolina Highway Patrol has a Troop 5 barracks in Conway, and provides services throughout the county. Myrtle Beach, Conway, Briarcliffe Acres, Atlantic Beach, Surfside Beach, Loris, and Aynor all have their own police departments, which patrol within the relevant town or city's border. North Myrtle Beach has a Public Safety Department, which provides police and fire services in the city of North Myrtle Beach.

In March 2020, Todd Cox, a former Horry County police officer, was fined $300 for failing to investigate reports of sex crimes against children. He and three other officers had been indicted in 2016 on charges of coercing sex and ignoring cases.

Party strength
Horry County used to be loyally Democratic, even by the standards of the Solid South. In 1936, Republican candidate Alf Landon did not receive a single vote in Horry County. In 1964, though, Barry Goldwater carried the county by a margin almost as large as John F. Kennedy's 1960 margin. It has voted Republican in every election since, with the exception of supporting the third-party candidacy of Alabama Governor George Wallace in 1968 and neighboring Georgia's Jimmy Carter in 1976. While conservative Democrats continued to hold most local offices into the 1990s, today, almost no elected Democrats are above the county level. No Democratic presidential candidate has received more than 40% of the county's vote since 2000.

Economy

In 2013, PTR Industries, a gunmaker, relocated to the Cool Springs Business Park near Aynor from Bristol, Connecticut. That state had passed restrictive gun control legislation following the Sandy Hook Elementary School shooting.

Twenty-one PTR employees relocated from Bristol. The company stated that it would hire an additional 30 workers in the first quarter of 2014, with a goal of having 120 employees by 2017.

Communities

Cities
 Conway (county seat)
 Loris
 Myrtle Beach (largest city)
 North Myrtle Beach

Towns
 Atlantic Beach
 Aynor
 Briarcliffe Acres
 Surfside Beach

Census-designated places

 Bucksport
 Carolina Forest
 Finklea
 Forestbrook
 Garden City
 Green Sea
 Homewood
 Ketchuptown
 Little River
 Live Oak
 Red Hill
 Socastee

Unincorporated communities & Neighborhoods

 Adrian
 Allsbrook
 Baxter Forks
 Bayboro
 Brooksville
 Bucksville
 Buck Forest
 Burgess
 Causey
 Cedar Branch
 Cherry Grove Beach
 Chestnut Hill
 Cochran Town
 Cool Spring
 Crescent Beach
 Daisy
 Dog Bluff
 Dongola
 Duford
 Fantasy Harbour
 Floyds Crossroads
 Forney
 Galivants Ferry
 Glass Hill
 Goretown
 Gurley
 Hand
 Hammond
 Hickory Grove
 Horry
 Howard
 Ingram Beach
 Jordanville
 Klondike
 Konig
 Little Town
 Longs
 Mt. Calvary
 Mt. Olive
 Nixonville
 Nixons Crossroads
 Ocean Drive Beach
 Pee Dee Crossroads
 Pine Island
 Playcards
 Poplar
 Red Bluff
 Stephens Crossroads
 Shell
 Springmaid Beach
 Toddville
 Twelvemile
 Wampee
 Windy Hill Beach
 Worthams Ferry

See also
 List of counties in South Carolina
 National Register of Historic Places listings in Horry County, South Carolina
 South Carolina State Parks
 National Wildlife Refuge
 Horry County Schools
 Waccamaw Indian People, state-recognized tribe that resides in the county
 2023 Chinese balloon incident, high-altitude balloon shot down over the Atlantic Ocean, east of the county

References

Further reading
 Horry County, South Carolina, 1730-1993, Catherine Heniford Lewis, University of South Carolina Press, 1998,

External links

 
 
 Horry County Schools

 
1801 establishments in South Carolina
Populated places established in 1801
Myrtle Beach metropolitan area